Percy Knott (1899 – unknown) was an English footballer who played in the Football League for Stoke.

Career
Knott was born in Stoke-upon-Trent and played for Hartshill White Star before joining Stoke just after World War I. He was used as understudy to Tom Kay due to injury to Kay, Knott played twelve matches towards the end of the 1920–21 season and fifteen during 1921–22. He left Stoke in 1922 and joined Queens Park Rangers where he never managed to get a match. After a three-year gap Knott played one match for Stoke during the 1925–26 season.

Career statistics

References

English footballers
Queens Park Rangers F.C. players
Stoke City F.C. players
English Football League players
1899 births
Year of death missing
Association football goalkeepers